Susan Hallowell, (1835-1911) was an American botanist, and Professor of Botany at Wellesley College.

Life
Throughout her life Hallowell was an avid seeker of knowledge and began a teaching career as soon as she graduated from Colby College.  Susan Hallowell pioneered in higher education for women.

She was the first woman to be admitted to the botanical lectures and laboratories of the University of Berlin, although this was not achieved with ease, as arriving in Europe she found that the universities on the continent were closed to women.

She taught in Bangor High School for more than 20 years, while continuing her own education in her spare time.   In order to further her knowledge, she worked in the Boston laboratories of renowned botanists Asa Gray and Louis Agassiz.

Wellesley College
By 1875, Henry Durant, the founder of Wellesley College, had become familiar with Hallowell's work in the Gray and Agassiz laboratories.  He appointed her as Chair of Natural History, which she then divided into zoology and botany departments.
 
Hallowel formed the original Botany Department, and became the first Chair and Professor of Botany in 1877.   The many botany courses she developed rarely changed in format, only needing additional or new scientific knowledge and discoveries incorporated into them.   She built up a botanical library, which at the time was only excelled in the U.S. by those of the best universities.

It is said that she cultivated her 'disciples', inviting her pupil Margaret Clay Ferguson from the class of 1891: to major in botany; gave her a position as instructor in 1893, and appointed her as the Head of the Botany Department in 1894. Ferguson later oversaw the creation of the arboretum and botanic garden as well as the 1925 greenhouse complex, the present day Margaret C. Ferguson Greenhouses.

In 1902, when Miss Hallowell was 67 years old, she retired from her position as professor.  From that time on she was Emeritus Professor of Botany at Wellesey.

Susan Hallowell was a member of the Torrey Botanical Society, which was instrumental in founding the New York Botanical Garden.

References

External links
Wellesley.edu: Wellesley College Botanic Garden website
Wellesley Weston Magazine: "A Hidden Gem - The Wellesley College Botanic Gardens and Margaret C. Ferguson Greenhouses"

1835 births
1911 deaths
American women botanists
Wellesley College faculty
Torrey Botanical Society members
Colby College alumni
Humboldt University of Berlin alumni
Scientists from Massachusetts
19th-century American botanists
20th-century American botanists
19th-century American women scientists
20th-century American women scientists
American women academics